Deep Run is a tributary of the Fifteenmile Creek, Allegany County, Maryland, in the United States.

References

Rivers of Maryland
Rivers of Allegany County, Maryland